Evgeny Alexandrovich Lebedev, Baron Lebedev (born 8 May 1980), is a Russian-British businessman, who owns Lebedev Holdings Ltd, which in turn owns the Evening Standard and ESTV (London Live). He is also an investor in The Independent.He derives his wealth from his father, Alexander Lebedev, a Russian oligarch and former KGB officer who was put on Canada's sanctions list following the 2022 Russian invasion of Ukraine.

In July 2020, Lebedev was nominated for a life peerage by British prime minister Boris Johnson for philanthropy and services to the media, a move that drew criticism. The Sunday Times alleged that British security services warned that granting Lebedev a peerage posed a national security risk, but Johnson went ahead with it despite the security service assessment. Boris Johnson said that the article was "simply incorrect." Lebedev has stated that he is not a security risk and his family "has a record of standing up for press freedom" in Russia. Lebedev has sat in the House of Lords as a crossbench life peer since 19 November 2020.

Early life and education
Born in Moscow, Lebedev is the son of Alexander Lebedev, a Russian banker and former officer of the First Chief Directorate of the USSR's KGB and later its successor, the SVR, and his first wife, engineer Natalia Sokolova; his maternal grandfather Vladimir Sokolov was a scientist, and a member of the Academy of Sciences of the USSR, later the Russian Academy of Sciences.

He moved to London at the age of eight, when his father began working at the KGB rezidentura in the Soviet Embassy. He attended St Barnabas and St Philip's Church of England Primary School in Kensington, followed by Holland Park Comprehensive School and Mill Hill School. He studied the history of art at Christie's in London. He has lived in the UK ever since, and became a British citizen (with dual nationality) in 2010.

Media interests
On 21 January 2009, Evgeny and his father bought a 65% share in the Evening Standard newspaper. The previous owners, Daily Mail and General Trust plc, continue to hold 24.9% of the company. Under the Lebedevs' ownership, it became a free newspaper in October 2009; circulation tripled immediately to 700,000.

On 25 March 2010, just weeks before it was due to close, Lebedev bought The Independent and The Independent on Sunday. On 26 October, the i newspaper was launched, the first national daily newspaper to be launched in the UK since The Independent in 1986, at a time of falling newspaper circulations and title closures. In 2011, he launched The Journalism Foundation, to promote "free and independent journalism throughout the world", although it was closed down after a year.

In February 2016, it was announced that Independent Press Ltd had reached an agreement to sell the i to Johnston Press, and that The Independent would become digital-only from March 2016. In 2019, it was reported that the government's then Culture Secretary Jeremy Wright issued a public interest intervention notice and investigation into Lebedev's sale of a 30% stake in the publications to a private Saudi investor. The Competition and Markets Authority's investigation found that the sale "would not result in a 'substantial lessening of competition'."  Ofcom judged that the sale had not led to "any influence" on the news outlets controlled by the British-Russian businessman.

Other business interests, real estate, and political influence
Lebedev co-owns The Grapes, a riverside pub in Limehouse, London, with Sir Ian McKellen and Sean Mathias. In 2012 he purchased the hotel Château Gütsch in Lucerne, Switzerland, and commissioned Martyn Lawrence Bullard to renovate it. He later sold it to Kirill Androsov.

He has been reported to own a flat in central London near Regent's Park as well as the Grade II-listed mansion Stud House in the grounds of Hampton Court Palace, and two large properties within  of each other in the Umbrian countryside, Italy.

He had maintained friendship with Boris Johnson since the late 2000s, with Lebedev's Evening Standard going all out in support of Johnson as the Mayor of London. Johnson has been reported to have attended vodka and caviar parties hosted by Alexander and Evgeny Lebedev in the UK and Italy  throughout the 2010s. According to the Byline Times, their relationship caused concern in the UK's security circles, who assessed both Johnson and Lebedev as security risks. The Byline Times reported that the evaluation of Evgeny Lebedev as a security risk changed in June 2020, the decision allegedly having been pushed through by Cabinet Office officials.

Peerage
In July 2020, he was nominated for a life peerage by prime minister Johnson in the 2020 Political Honours. Lebedev has sat in the House of Lords as a crossbench life peer since 19 November 2020 with the title Baron Lebedev, of Hampton in the London Borough of Richmond upon Thames and of Siberia in the Russian Federation. Lebedev was supported at his House of Lords introduction ceremony by Lord Clarke of Nottingham and Lord Bird. He made his maiden speech during the Queen's speech debate on 12 May 2021.The Sunday Times reported that security services were uneasy over Lebedev from 2013 and Lebedev's father was a KGB agent. SNP leader Ian Blackford wanted Lebedev's parliamentary pass revoked due to these concerns. House of Lords speaker Lord McFall said the procedure for vetting new peers should be tightened up. The Guardian wrote, "Johnson has been accused of brushing off security concerns about Lebedev, with whom he has a close relationship, attending parties at his Italian castle, including when he was foreign secretary." Lebedev has stated that he is not a security risk and is "proud to be a British citizen and consider Britain my home". He said his father "spent his time campaigning against corruption and illegal financial dealings" and his family "has a record of standing up for press freedom" in Russia.The Guardian described Lebedev as "a surprise name among the 36 life peerage nominations which have led to accusations of 'cronyism' against the prime minister". Mark Galeotti wrote that the move indicated Johnson's eagerness "to show contempt for Britain's intelligence agencies." Dominic Cummings said that Boris Johnson was warned of security concerns. The New York Times wrote in 2022, "nobody is a better example of the cosy ties between Russians and the [British] establishment than Mr Lebedev."

As of March 2022, Lebedev had spoken only once in the Lords. After this was reported, he asked two parliamentary questions.

The Labour Party tabled a House of Commons motion that would force the government to reveal security advice given to prime minister Johnson about the peerage.  A number of Conservative MPs supported the motion, which on 29 March 2022 succeeded, requiring the documents to be made available to MPs by 28 April that year. However, the deadline was missed and the Cabinet Office Minister Michael Ellis confirmed that more time was needed to consider what information could be divulged. A few weeks later the government informed the House of Commons that, in order to "protect national security", the detailed security advice would not be released.

Charity work
Lebedev is the patron of the Evening Standard Dispossessed Fund, which helps to address poverty in London, and has raised over £13m since its launch in 2010. In 2018, he launched #AIDSFree, a cross-title campaign between The Independent and Evening Standard to raise money for the Elton John AIDS Foundation. In 2019, he announced that both newspapers would launch a multiple-year campaign to tackle homelessness in London and around the world.

Since the coronavirus lockdown began in the United Kingdom, Lebedev's news titles appealed in partnership with food surplus charity The Felix Project to supply food to vulnerable people, frontline charities and NHS hospitals. In December 2020, the 'Food for London Now' appeal announced that it had surpassed its £10 million target and delivered 20 million meals.

Personal life
According to The Daily Telegraph, Lebedev previously dated British actress Joely Richardson. While he denies rumours about him being gay, which earned him the nickname "Two Beards" coined by Private Eye, he is said not to mind people thinking so, according to media reports.

Lord Lebedev collects modern British art, and owns pieces by Tracey Emin, Sir Antony Gormley, Damien Hirst, Francis Bacon, Lucian Freud and Jake and Dinos Chapman. According to the New Statesman'', he also has a wide knowledge of Renaissance art and vorticist poetry. He had a pet wolf called Boris, named after the former Russian President Boris Yeltsin.

Notes

References

External links

 

1980 births
Living people
People from Kensington
Businesspeople from London
Russian newspaper publishers (people)
The Independent people
People educated at Mill Hill School
British newspaper publishers (people)
Russian emigrants to the United Kingdom
Soviet emigrants to the United Kingdom
Naturalised citizens of the United Kingdom
Boris Johnson controversies
Russian interference in British politics
Russia intelligence operations
Crossbench life peers
Russian businesspeople in the United Kingdom
Life peers created by Elizabeth II